"Escape Me" is a single recorded by Tiësto, featuring vocals from Cydney Celeste "C. C." Sheffield, an actress from Los Angeles who helped write the song with her rock band colleague Nico Chiotellis. Released on 23 November 2009, the song is the second single from Tiësto's album Kaleidoscope. Tiësto was the primary producer of the song, assisted by longtime collaborators DJ Waakop Reijers-Fraaij and Tijs Verwest.

The music video for "Escape Me" premiered on Tiësto's official YouTube channel on 12 October 2009.

Formats and track listings
 "Escape Me"  – 4:18
 "Escape Me"  – 7:55
 "Escape Me"  – 6:50
 "Escape Me"  – 7:48
 "Escape Me"  – 6:52

Charts

References

External links
 "Escape Me" music video

2009 singles
Tiësto songs
Songs written by Tiësto